Frasnelli is an Italian surname. Notable people with the surname include:

Loris Frasnelli (born 1979), Italian cross country skier 
Luana Frasnelli (born 1975), Italian ice hockey player

Italian-language surnames